Scooter Park (born March 5, 1966) is an American politician who served in the Oklahoma House of Representatives from the 65th district from 2014 to 2018.

On June 26, 2018, he was defeated in the Republican primary for the 65th district.

References

1966 births
Living people
Republican Party members of the Oklahoma House of Representatives